Sebastián Masdeu Menasanch (1889 – 5 January 1964) was a Spanish cyclist, who won the first edition of the Volta a Catalunya in 1911.

Major results
1908
 6th Overall Volta a Tarragona
1911
 1st  Overall Volta a Catalunya
1st Stages 1 & 3
 3rd Road race, National Road Championships

References

External links

1889 births
1964 deaths
Spanish male cyclists
Cyclists from Catalonia
Sportspeople from Tarragona
20th-century Spanish people